Miss Betty is a romance novel by Bram Stoker, written in 1898. It was published one year after the release of Stoker's Dracula.

Online texts
 Bram Stoker Online Full PDF version of this novel.

References

1898 British novels
Irish romance novels
Novels by Bram Stoker